Santos Dumont Airport  is the airport serving Paranaguá, Brazil. Like the airport in Rio de Janeiro, it is named after the Brazilian aviation pioneer Alberto Santos Dumont (1873–1932).

It is operated by the Municipality of Paranaguá under the supervision of Aeroportos do Paraná (SEIL).

Airlines and destinations
No scheduled flights operate at this airport.

Access

See also

List of airports in Brazil

References

External links

Airports in Paraná (state)
Paranaguá